Nebraska's 5th congressional district is an obsolete district. It was created after the 1890 United States census and eliminated after the 1940 United States census.

References

 Congressional Biographical Directory of the United States 1774–present

05
Former congressional districts of the United States
1893 establishments in Nebraska
1943 disestablishments in Nebraska